Nick Gill (born 25 August 1982) is a former professional Australian rules football player who played for the Adelaide Football Club in the Australian Football League (AFL). He was originally drafted by Melbourne in the 2000 pre-season draft but was delisted at the end of 2001. He then spent 2002 playing with Port Melbourne in the VFL and after a good season was selected by the Kangaroos in the 2002 rookie draft. He was again delisted after only one season and in 2004 returned to play for the North Adelaide Roosters where he was runner-up in the Magarey Medal in 2005.

AFL career
His 2006 form with North Adelaide Roosters was not the best but impressive results at the South Australian state screening saw him drafted by the Crows with the 64th pick of the 2006 AFL Draft. The Crows also drafted Gill as a mature-age recruit to act as insurance for the injured Trent Hentschel.

Despite not having the best of starts after being plagued by hamstring injuries at the start of the season, Gill eventually worked his way back into form to be picked for his first game in a forward pocket for the Round 17 clash against the Essendon Football Club in 2007.

In 2008 Gill was in and out of the side, becoming a fixture late in the season due to injuries to several key forwards. 

Gill but struggled with injuries in 2009, and was unable to break into a suddenly potent Adelaide forward line. At the end of the season, he was one of five players delisted by Adelaide.

Gill played for the North Hobart Football Club during the 2013 TSL season.

Radio
Nick was part of the SAFM breakfast show with Hayley, Rabbit & Cosi as the sports guru in Adelaide. In 2014 he replaced Ali Carle on Triple M Adelaide's Hot Breakfast. Nick currently hosts Hit 106.9 Newcastle's Breakfast Show with Jess Farchione & Ducko.

References

External links

1982 births
North Adelaide Football Club players
Adelaide Football Club players
Living people
People educated at Scotch College, Melbourne
Port Melbourne Football Club players
Oakleigh Chargers players
Australian rules footballers from Victoria (Australia)
North Hobart Football Club players